Scolecomorphus vittatus, the banded caecilian, is a species of caecilian in the family Scolecomorphidae,  endemic to Tanzania. Its natural habitats are subtropical or tropical moist lowland forests, subtropical or tropical moist montane forests, plantations, rural gardens, and heavily degraded former forests.

The effects of S. vittatus skin toxin have been observed after a researcher, as part of a joke, put a specimen in their mouth: it was reported as causing a burning sensation and uncontrollable salivation lasting more than 30 minutes. The specimen was not visibly harmed.

References

Scolecomorphus
Amphibians of Tanzania
Endemic fauna of Tanzania
Amphibians described in 1895
Taxonomy articles created by Polbot